The Prefect of Ain is the highest state representative in the department of Ain on the East border of France. Its seat is in Bourg-en-Bresse.

The office was created in 1800 under Napoléon Bonaparte, then First Consul of the French First Republic, to ensure the representation of the state in the departements and the full application of the national law. Under the Fifth Republic, the powers of a Prefect are governed by article 72 of the Constitution, completed by Law 1992-125 and Decrees 2004-374 and 2010–146.

List of Prefects of Ain

References

See also
 Prefect
 Prefectures in France

French civil servants
Government of France